The 1959 Isle of Man TT, the second round of the 1959 Grand Prix motorcycle racing season, involved races on both the Mountain Course and the Clypse Course on the Isle of Man. John Surtees won the Senior race with a time of 3:00.13.4, adding to his earlier victory in the Junior race. Tarquinio Provini won both the Lightweight and Ultra-Lightweight categories, while Walter Schneider and H.Strauss won the sidecar event.

1959 Isle of Man Junior TT 350cc final standings
7 Laps (264.11 Miles) Mountain Course.

1959 Isle of Man Lightweight TT 250cc final standings
10 Laps (107.90 miles) Clypse Course.

1959 Isle of Man Ultra-Lightweight TT 125cc final standings
10 Laps (107.90 miles) Clypse Course.

1959 Sidecar TT final standings
10 Laps (107.90 miles) Clypse Course.

1959 Isle of Man Senior TT 500cc final standings
7 Laps (274.11 Miles) Mountain Course.

External links
 Detailed race results
 Mountain Course map

Isle of Man Tt
Tourist Trophy
Isle of Man TT
Isle of Man TT